Stretchia is a moth genus in the family Noctuidae.

Species
 Stretchia inferior (Smith, 1888)
 Stretchia muricina (Grote, 1876)
 Stretchia pacifica McDunnough, 1949
 Stretchia pictipennis McDunnough, 1949
 Stretchia plusiaeformis H. Edwards, 1874
 Stretchia prima (Smith, 1891)

References
Natural History Museum Lepidoptera genus database
Stretchia at funet

Orthosiini